Olga Karpova (born 10 June 1980) is a retired Kazakhstani volleyball player. She competed in the women's tournament at the 2008 Summer Olympics.

References

1980 births
Living people
Kazakhstani women's volleyball players
Olympic volleyball players of Kazakhstan
Volleyball players at the 2008 Summer Olympics
Sportspeople from Minsk
Kazakhstani people of Belarusian descent
Volleyball players at the 2006 Asian Games
Asian Games competitors for Kazakhstan
20th-century Kazakhstani women
21st-century Kazakhstani women